Latremenoi Mou Geitones or My Beloved Neighbors is a Greek TV serial written by Panos Amarantidis, directed by Pierros Andrakakos, created by Studio ATA and broadcast on Mega Channel starting in 2007 with additional episodes in 2008.

The series is based on a Spanish production, Mis Adorables Vecinos.

The series revolves around the lives of two families. The Moustoxides family is from a poor neighborhood and working class, however their young daughter, Betty, wins a reality singing show (much like Pop Idol) and ends up a superstar with the family becoming very rich. They move in next door to the Papapavlos family who are sophisticated Athenians.

At the heart of the story is the on-off relationship between Aris Moustoxidis (Dimitris Vlachos) and Lisa Papapavlou (Smaragda Kalimoukou).

The Families

The Moustoxidis Family
 Babis (Kostas Koklas) was a greengrocer; he's now so rich he doesn't have to work but has problems coming to terms with doing nothing all day. He argues loudly with his wife but they are always in love and have a healthy relationship.
 Pelagia (Ava Galanopoulou) worked in a hairdresser.
 Aris (Dimitris Vlachos) is the older son of the family. He has an on-off relationship with Lisa from the next door and makes friends easily at his new school including a romantic interlude with different girls. However he sometimes goes too far (notably annoying his English teacher (Sean James Sutton) and causing problems in class).
 Mihalakis (Dimitris Daoulis) is the younger son of the family.
 Betty (Nefeli Kanaki) is the daughter of family and the cause of all the wealth.
 Zambeta (Efi Papatheodorou) is the Pelagia's mother who lives with them. 
 Ioulia (Eleni Tzortzi) is the maid of the family.

The Papapavlou Family
 Vyron (Giorgos Konstantis) is the father of family also a plastic surgeon with a cash strapped surgery. He is the main butt of the jokes and often gets frustrated by the actions of his new neighbours.
 Miranda (Arietta Moutousi) is the mother of family, more sympathetic to their new neighbours and tries, in her subtle way, to help them (especially Pelagia) fit in with the sophisticated Northern Athens suburb life.
 Lisa (Smaragda Kalimoukou) is the older daughter and has accepted the family but is frustrated by Aris and their on-off relationship.
 Nefeli (Vasiliki Kara is the younger daughter of the family.
 Konstantinos (Kostantinos Lagos) the son of the family.
 Milica (Anna Dimitrijevic) is the maid of family.

Focus

Although there are occasional glimpses of the underlying tensions involved with class and behaviour, upbringing and status, the series generally focuses on the obvious for its humour, for example the way in which Pelagia dresses and behaves betrays her origins and often the upper-class locals look down on her ways.

Ratings
The first season averaged a 35% rating and the second, with a lot of changes (writer, cast etc.),  22%.

External links
IMDB Site

Mega Channel original programming
2007 Greek television series debuts
2009 Greek television series endings
2000s Greek television series
Greek television soap operas